The Ministry for Environment, Land and Sea Protection of Italy (Italian: Ministero dell'Ambiente e della Tutela del Territorio e del Mare, also known as MATTM) was an Italian ministry established in 1981. The ministry is responsible for environmental issues in Italy. It was led by the Minister of the Environment. it was abolished in 2021, and replaced by the Ministry of the Ecological Transition.

References

External links
 Ministry of Environment official website (Italian)

Environment
Italia
Ministries established in 1981
1981 establishments in Italy
Ministries disestablished in 2021
2021 disestablishments in Italy